A referendum on establishing a national unity government after the Tanzanian October 2010 elections was held in Zanzibar on 31 July 2010. The proposal was approved, and the losing party in the elections was subsequently allowed to nominate the First Vice President.

Results

References

Referendums in Tanzania
Zanzibar
Zanzibar